Vasily Alexeyevich Yurchenko (born September 26, 1960) is a Russian politician. Governor in Novosibirsk Oblast (2010—2014).

Biography 
Vasily Yurchenko was born in Karasuk on September 26, 1960.

He graduated from the Novosibirsk State Academy of Water Transport in 1982. Candidate of technical sciences.

In January 2004, he was appointed to the post of head of the Department for the Development of Industry and Entrepreneurship of the Administration of the Novosibirsk Oblast.

In February 2005, he was appointed First Deputy Governor of the Novosibirsk Region.

On September 9, 2010, by decree of the President of the Russian Federation, Dmitry Medvedev was appointed interim governor of the Novosibirsk Oblast; on September 22 of the same year, he was approved.

On March 17, 2014, he was relieved of his post by President of the Russian Federation Vladimir Putin due to the loss of confidence.

References

External links 
 Указ Президента Российской Федерации от 9 сентября 2010 года № 1116
 ФедералПресс
 Василий Юрченко. Справка РИА "Новости".

1960 births
Living people
Governors of Novosibirsk Oblast
United Russia politicians
Siberian State University of Water Transport alumni